Newquay Bay is a bay adjacent to Newquay in Cornwall, England.

Newquay Bay includes Lusty Glaze beach and Porth beach.

References

Bays of Cornwall
Newquay
Tourist attractions in Cornwall